The Latobrigi (or Latovici) were a Celtic tribe mentioned in Julius Caesar's Commentarii. According to Caesar, 14.000 Latobrigi joined the Helvetii in their attempted migration to southwestern France in 58 BC, together with several larger contingents from other tribes. After the defeat at Bibracte, they were ordered to return to their homes and are not mentioned again in the Commentarii.

Due to the lack of sources, their localisation remains largely speculative, though an area close to the Helvetian territory is usually assumed. It has been suggested that they may be attested in an inscription from Brigantia-Bregenz, Austria, or that Juliomagus-Schleitheim might have been their tribal centre. They are normally not identified with the Pannonian tribe of a similar name, the Latobici.

Notes

 

Tribes involved in the Gallic Wars